Miller Building may refer to:

Miller Building (Denver, Colorado), a Denver Landmark
 Miller-Davis Law Buildings, Bloomington, IL, listed on the National Register of Historic Places (NRHP) in McLean County, Illinois
 Miller Building (Davenport, Iowa), listed on the NRHP in Scott County, Iowa
 Ola Babcock Miller Building, listed on the NRHP in Polk County, Iowa as the Iowa State Historical Building
 Miller Brothers Building, Lexington, KY, listed on the NRHP in Fayette County, Kentucky
 Miller-Roy Building, Monroe, LA, listed on the NRHP in Ouachita Parish, Louisiana
 Miller Building, Matthews Hardware, Metropolitan Building, Columbia, MO, listed on the NRHP in Boone County, Missouri
 Miller Building (Liberty, Missouri), listed on the NRHP in Clay County, Missouri
 Miller Building (Portland, Maine), listed on the National Register of Historic Places
 Miller-Jackson Building, Oklahoma City, OK, listed on the NRHP in Oklahoma County, Oklahoma
 Miller Brothers Department Store, Chattanooga, TN, listed on the NRHP in Hamilton County, Tennessee
I. Miller Building, landmark building in Manhattan, New York City